Lucas Daniel Suárez (born 8 February 1984) is an Argentine footballer. 

He played for Audax Italiano.

Club career

Early career
Suárez began his career in 2004 with Rosario club Newell's Old Boys, where he played at the reserves team during his spell at Newell's. Two years later, he moved to amateur side of fourth division Gimnasia y Esgrima de Mendoza. In 2007, Suárez signed by Uruguayan club Tacuarembó.

Audax Italiano
Suárez signed for Audax Italiano in January 2008, and contested the post of starter keeper with the Paraguayan Mario Villasanti. On 14 April, he made his Chilean Primera División debut in a 3–0 away win over Deportes Antofagasta, for the fifteenth match day of the Apertura Tournament. Due to his good performance against Antofagasta, coach Raúl Toro played him in the next match against Universidad de Chile in a 2–0 away loss. After his first two games for the club, he started in a 2–1 home win over Cobreloa and in a 3–0 away win over Everton for the first leg of the playoffs quarterfinals. In the second leg of the playoffs, he was seen as responsible for the elimination of Audax, after his start in a 4–1 loss. After his debut tournament, throughout the 2008 season and into his second year with Audax, he was third-choice to Johnny Herrera and Villasanti. Suárez made his last appearance for the club in the 2009 Apertura Tournament, in a 4–1 home defeat to Universidad de Chile. In December of that year, he left Audax, because his opportunities in the team were limited.

References

External links
 Lucas Suárez at Football-Lineups
 

1984 births
Living people
Argentine footballers
Argentine expatriate footballers
Argentina international footballers
Newell's Old Boys footballers
Tacuarembó F.C. players
Audax Italiano footballers
Expatriate footballers in Chile
Expatriate footballers in Uruguay
Association football goalkeepers
Sportspeople from Córdoba Province, Argentina